István Fáry (30 June 1922 – 2 November 1984) was a Hungarian-born mathematician known for his work in geometry and algebraic topology. He proved Fáry's theorem that every planar graph has a straight-line embedding in 1948, and the Fáry–Milnor theorem lower-bounding the curvature of a nontrivial knot in 1949.

Biography
Fáry was born June 30, 1922 in Gyula, Hungary. After studying for a master's degree at the University of Budapest, he moved to the University of Szeged, where he earned a Ph.D. in 1947. He then studied at the Sorbonne before taking a faculty position at the University of Montreal in 1955. He moved to the University of California, Berkeley in 1958 and became a full professor in 1962. He died on November 2, 1984, in El Cerrito, California.

Selected publications
.
.

References

External links
 Photos from the Oberwolfach Photo Collection
 

1922 births
1984 deaths
20th-century Hungarian mathematicians
University of California, Berkeley College of Letters and Science faculty
Geometers
Topologists
University of Paris alumni
Hungarian expatriates in France
Hungarian expatriates in Canada
Hungarian expatriates in the United States